{{DISPLAYTITLE:Yttrium (90Y) tacatuzumab tetraxetan}}

Yttrium (90Y) tacatuzumab tetraxetan (trade name AFP-Cide) is a humanized monoclonal antibody intended for the treatment of cancer. The antibody itself, tacatuzumab, is conjugated with tetraxetan, a chelator for yttrium-90, a radioisotope which destroys the tumour cells.

References

Monoclonal antibodies for tumors
Antibody-drug conjugates
Radiopharmaceuticals
Yttrium compounds
Experimental cancer drugs
DOTA (chelator) derivatives